TPR may refer to:

Businesses and organisations 
The Pensions Regulator, a non-departmental public body of the United Kingdom
The Princeton Review, an American educational preparation company
Tapestry, Inc., an American clothing company (NYSE stock ticker: TPR)
Texas Public Radio

Periodicals 
The Paris Review, an American literary magazine
Planetary Report, the Planetary Society's magazine about space exploration
Town Planning Review, a journal published by Liverpool University Press

Science and technology

Medicine 
Tetratricopeptide repeat, a degenerate protein sequence
Total pelvic rest, an obstetric prescription for placenta previa to avoid objects in the vagina
Total peripheral resistance, the cumulative resistance of arterioles
Translocated promoter region, part of a cancer-causing  protein

Other uses in science and technology 
Temperature-programmed reduction
Thermoplastic rubber, a mixed polymer material
True positive rate, a statistical measure

Recreation 
Tarbes Pyrénées Rugby, a French rugby club
Tournament performance rating, in chess
The Pretty Reckless, an American rock band fronted by Taylor Momsen

Other uses 
Total physical response, a language teaching method
Tom Price Airport, IATA airport code "TPR"
Trooper (rank) (Tpr), a rank in Commonwealth armies, and some state police organizations
Tuvan People's Republic (1921–44)
Cavallo Agricolo Italiano da Tiro Pesante Rapido or Italian Heavy Draft breed of horse